|}

The Knights Royal Hurdle is a National Hunt hurdle race in England which is open to horses aged four or five years. 
It was run at Ascot over a distance of 2 miles (3,218 metres), and was scheduled to take place each year in December.

The race was first run in 1965 and was last run in 2000.

The race was initially known as the Knights Royal Hurdle, but from 1972 it was known as the S.G.B. Hire Shops Hurdle, later changed to the H.S.S. Hire Shops Hurdle.
The original name was re-adopted in 1993.

During the eighties and nineties, when it held Listed status, the race often attracted some of the best second season hurdlers.

Winners
{| class = "sortable" | border="1" cellpadding="0" style="border-collapse: collapse; font-size:90%"
|- bgcolor="#77dd77" align="center"
| style="width:36px" | Year
| style="width:160px" | Winner
| style="width:30px" | Age
| style="width:180px" | Jockey
| style="width:180px" | Trainer
|-
|1965 || Compton Martin || 6 || Stan Mellor || G Todd
|-bgcolor="#eeeeee"
|1966 Abandoned because of waterlogged state of course  || 
|-bgcolor="#eeeeee"
|1967 Abandoned because of foot and mouth epidemic  || 
|-bgcolor="#eeeeee"
|1968 Abandoned because of waterlogged state of course  || 
|-
|1969 || Moyne Royal || 4 || B Leyman || Reg Akehurst
|-
|1970 || Bowie's Brig || 4 || Barry Brogan || Arthur Pitt
|-
|1971 || Flower Picker || 5 || A Branford || Fulke Walwyn
|-
|1972 || Ruisselet || 5 || Paul Kelleway || Ryan Price
|-
|1973 || Lanzarote || 5 || Richard Pitman || Fred Winter
|-
|1974 || Tree Tangle || 5 || Andy Turnell || Bob Turnell
|-
|1975 || Grand Canyon || 5 || Peter Haynes || Derek Kent
|-bgcolor="#eeeeee"
|1976 Abandoned because of frost  || 
|-
|1977 || Kybo || 4 || Gerry Enright || Josh Gifford
|-
|1978 || Kybo || 5 || Bob Champion || Josh Gifford
|-
|1979 || Walnut Wonder || 4 || Lorna Vincent || Les Kennard
|-
|1980 || Heighlin || 4 || Steve Jobar || David Elsworth
|-bgcolor="#eeeeee"
|1981 Abandoned because of snow  || 
|-
|1982 || Carved Opal || 4 || Colin Brown || Fred Winter
|-
|1983 || Admiral's Cup || 5 || John Francome || Fred Winter
|-
|1984 || See You Then || 4 || John Francome || Nicky Henderson
|-
|1985 || First Bout || 4 || Steve Smith Eccles || Nicky Henderson
|-
|1986 || Nohalmdun || 5 || Peter Scudamore || Peter Easterby
|-
| 1987
| Osric
| 4
| Graham McCourt
| Mick Ryan
|-
| 1988
| Celtic Chief
| 5
| Richard Dunwoody
| Mrs Mercy Rimell
|-
| 1989
| Forest Sun
| 4
| Jimmy Frost
| Toby Balding
|-
| 1990
| Wonder Man
| 5
| Mark Pitman
| Jenny Pitman
|-bgcolor="#eeeeee"
|1991 Abandoned because of frost  || 
|-
| 1992
| Baydon Star
| 5
| Richard Dunwoody
| David Nicholson
|-
| 1993
| Absalom's Lady
| 5
| Paul Holley
| David Elsworth
|-
| 1994
| Relkeel
| 5
| Adrian Maguire
| David Nicholson
|-
| 1995
| Pridwell
| 5
| Tony McCoy
| Martin Pipe
|-
| 1996
| Mistinguett
| 4
| Carl Llewellyn
| Nigel Twiston-Davies
|-
| 1997
| Mr Markham
| 5
| Philip Hide
| Josh Gifford
|-
| 1998
| Toto Toscato
| 4
| Adrian Maguire
| David Nicholson
|-
| 1999
| Blue Royal
| 4
| Mick Fitzgerald
| Nicky Henderson
|-
| 2000
| Valiramix
| 4
| Tony McCoy
| Martin Pipe
|}

References
Racing Post

National Hunt races in Great Britain
National Hunt hurdle races
Ascot Racecourse
Discontinued horse races